The Amazing Race Asia 5 is the fifth season of The Amazing Race Asia, a reality television game show based on the American series The Amazing Race. The fifth installment of the show returned after a 6-year hiatus and featured eleven teams of two for the first time in the Asia's version of franchise, each with a pre-existing relationship, in a race across Southeast Asia to win US$100,000.

The season premiered on 13 October 2016 and the finale aired on 15 December 2016.

Allan Wu returned to host his fifth season of The Amazing Race Asia and eleventh season of The Amazing Race franchise overall. Wu was paired up with Tara Basro, an Indonesian film actress in hosting this season while in Indonesia.

Beauty queens Parul Shah and Maggie Wilson from the Philippines were the winners of this season, marking the Philippines's second consecutive win in The Amazing Race Asia.

Production

Development and filming

On 20 May 2016, Sony Pictures Television (SPT) Networks Asia announced that The Amazing Race Asia would return for its fifth season after a six-year long hiatus and would be broadcast by AXN Asia. The tagline for this season was most adrenaline-fueled season ever. This season adopted the American-style title sequence (based on Season 23). The Minister of Tourism of Indonesia, Arief Yahya, revealed the season's destinations beginning in Jakarta and traveling to local Indonesian destinations along with Singapore, Kuala Lumpur, Ho Chi Minh City, and Manila before finishing in Bali. There was a planned visit in Taipei, Taiwan but was scrapped within a last minute and replaced by Phuket, Thailand leg. This season covered , the shortest route of The Amazing Race Asia, and mostly focused the competition in Indonesia, where the Starting Line and the Finish Line were held (the first time since Season 3 to do so in the same country, although the Starting Line and Finish Line were located in different cities), with the remaining countries in Southeast Asia.

Though both Wu and Basro were present at the Starting Line, Indonesian Deputy Minister of Tourism Sapta Nirwandar officially flagged the teams off. This was the first time in any edition worldwide that the host did not officially signal the start of the competition. Nirwandar also appeared at the Finish Line as a greeter. In other legs conducted in Indonesia, Basro would take the place of the greeter.

Zabrina Fernandez & Joe Jer Tee, the winners of the first season, were the Pit Stop greeters for Leg 3 in their home country of Malaysia.

This season introduced a new twist: the Speed Bump. Similar to the American version, the team that placed last in the non-elimination leg had to perform a Speed Bump somewhere in the next leg before they could continue racing. This season also for the first time in The Amazing Race Asia featured 11 teams, which the number 11th teams were eliminated at the starting line task (same as Season 15 of the American version and Season 3 of China Rush). Unlike the first leg in Season 15 of the American version and the first leg of Season 3 of China Rush, both in which the last team that arrived at the Pit Stop was told that it was a non-elimination leg, this version's first leg also ended with a standard end-of-leg elimination.

This season was also the first time in The Amazing Race Asia that a U-Turn board was placed at the Detour decision point, during Leg 9, rather than after the Detour itself (the first time this twist was introduced in all franchises was in the tenth leg of the 27th American version). Leg 9 is also the first leg in all franchises of The Amazing Race where both Yield and U-Turn were present in the same leg.

Casting
Casting began on 23 May 2016 and applications were closed on 30 June 2016 (18 days extended from the original deadline of 12 June 2016).

Marketing
Wonderful Indonesia, Grab, Garuda Indonesia along with Great Eastern Life were sponsors of the season. It was also the first season that was not sponsored by Sony or Caltex.

Casting
Continuing the casting trend of the Asian franchise, the cast once again consisted of numerous local celebrities or their relatives including 87.6 Hard Rock FM radio announcer Vicky Harahap, Philippines national rugby union team member and host of It's Showtime Eric Tai, Miss Grand International 2015 Parul Shah and Miss Philippines World 2007 Maggie Wilson, Miss Malaysia World 2011 Chloe Chen and Miss Malaysia World 2012 Yvonne Lee, The 8TV Quickie host Brandon Ho, News One Prime Time news anchor Louisa Kusnandar, Power 98 Radio DJs Jerald Justin "JK" Ko & Michael "Mike" Tan, and "UMeAndHara" YouTuber Rei Umehara. Tai is the only non-Asian contestant in the entire season.

This is the first season not to feature a team from Hong Kong, but also the first with a Vietnamese team.

Yvonne Lee was seen dating host Allan Wu after the show.

Results
The list of teams with their relationships at the time of filming were announced on 28 July 2016 from the AXN website. Placements are listed in finishing order.
A  placement with a dagger indicates that the team was eliminated. 
A  placement with a double-dagger indicates that the team was the last to arrive at a pit stop in a non-elimination leg, and had to perform a Speed Bump task in the following leg.
A  indicates that the team won a Fast Forward
A  indicates that the team chose to use the Yield, and a  indicates the team who received it.
A  indicates that the team chose to use the U-Turn, and a  indicates the team who received it..

Notes

Episode title quotes
Episode titles are often taken from quotes made by the racers. Where not named, the producers assigned the title.
"The Race is On!" – Alex
"From Zero to Hero" – Yvonne
"The Value of Insurance" – Roadblock Prompt
"The Pain Does Not Exist"
"Taste Like Chicken" – Treasuri
"Made With Love"
"By Air, Land and Sea"
"Should Have Turned Left" – JK
"No More Mr. Nice Guy!"
"One Hell of a Race Day" – Maggie

Prizes
Individual prizes were awarded to the first team to complete certain legs.
Leg 1 – Tickets to Bali, courtesy of Garuda Indonesia.
Leg 5 – Tickets to anywhere, courtesy of Garuda Indonesia.
Leg 7 – Access to Premium Lounge, courtesy of Garuda Indonesia
Leg 10 –

Race summary

Leg 1 (Jakarta → West Java)
Airdate: 13 October 2016

Central Jakarta, Jakarta, Indonesia (Merdeka Square – National Monument) (Starting Line)
Central Jakarta (Sapta Pesona Building) (Elimination Point)
North Jakarta (Museum Bahari – Syahbandar Tower )
 West Jakarta (Fatahillah Square) or North Jakarta (Port of Sunda Kelapa)
Bogor, West Java  (Kebun Raya Bogor)
Bogor (Kebun Raya Bogor – Taman Teijsmann)
Bogor (Kebun Raya Bogor – Lotus Pond) 

This season's first Detour was a choice between Fix or Freight. In Fix, teams traveled to Fatahillah Square, where they had to fix and assemble an Onthel bicycle's tyre according to the example so that a child could ride it to receive their next clue. In Freight, teams traveled to the Port of Sunda Kelapa, where they had to fill a sack with sand in a traditional Indonesian pinisi and carry it to fill four barrels on the dock and receive their next clue.

Additional tasks
At the Sapta Pesona Building, teams had to search through over 1,000 compasses for one of 10 compasses that head 210 degrees southwest and present it to Allan and Tara to receive their next clue. The last team without the correct compass was eliminated.
At Kebun Raya Bogor, teams had to search for a male Ondel-ondel dancer holding their next clue. Teams then had to bring the male Ondel-ondel dancer, from which they got their previous clue, to Taman Teijsmann to search for its female counterpart according to the pattern of the scarfs that the dancers wore. Once the dancers were correctly paired, the puppet master would give them their next clue. Teams would then bring the dancers to the Pit Stop at the Lotus Pond.

Leg 2 (Jakarta → West Java)

Airdate: 20 October 2016
Central Jakarta, Jakarta (Pecenongan Street) (Pit Start)
East Jakarta (Taman Mini Indonesia Indah)
West Bandung, West Java (Cikole National Park ) 
Subang (Ciater – Walini Tea Plantation )  

This leg's Detour was a choice between Basket Bikes or Bandung Biathlon. In Basket Bikes, teams had to ride downhill along a  bicycle trail and deliver two dozen sellable eggs in their baskets to the egg merchant to receive their next clue. However if any of the eggs broke along the way, teams would have to restart the entire task. In Bandung Biathlon, teams had to hit a set of targets with traditional bamboo guns while trekking uphill in a pair of traditional tandem land skis, known as bakiak, to receive their next clue.

In this season's first Roadblock, one team member had to comb a large section of a tea plantation to find a Wayang Golek, a traditional Indonesian puppet figurine, that they could exchange for their next clue.

Additional task
In Taman Mini Indonesia Indah, teams had to ride on Grab bikes around the park to spot for seven marked letters (B, A, N, D, U, N, G). Once done, they had to make their way to the Tugu Api Pancasila monument and write down on a provided chalkboard the word Bandung, which spelled out their next destination, to receive their next clue.

Leg 3 (West Java → Malaysia)

Airdate: 27 October 2016
Bandung (Merdeka Street) (Pit Start)
 Tangerang, Banten (Soekarno–Hatta International Airport) to Kuala Lumpur, Malaysia (Kuala Lumpur International Airport)
Kuala Lumpur (Great Eastern Tower) 
 Kuala Lumpur (Kuala Lumpur Sentral Railway Station) to Butterworth, Penang (Butterworth Railway Station)
George Town (Waterfall Hill Temple)
George Town (Chew Clan Jetty)
 George Town (Armenian Street or Han Jiang Ancestral Temple)
George Town (Yeo Clan Jetty – Hean Boo Thean Temple) 

In this leg's Roadblock, one team member had to rappel down the  building of Great Eastern Tower and grab the flag attached on the building in exchange for their next clue. If racers missed the flag or dropped it, they had to attempt the challenge again.

This leg's Detour was a choice between Street Art or Street Play. In Street Art, teams had to ride a traditional trishaw around Armenian Street in George Town, Penang and find five Penang street arts in the city centre matching provided pictures. Then, they had to convince locals to take their picture at each of the murals to receive their next clue. In Street Play, teams traveled to Han Jiang Ancestral Temple. Then, they had to learn to perform a two-minute Chinese opera fight routine and perform it with a musical accompaniment to the satisfaction of the judge to receive their next clue.

Additional tasks
At the start of the leg, teams headed to Garuda Indonesia head office at Senayan City in Jakarta, Indonesia to purchase airline tickets to Kuala Lumpur.
At Waterfall Hill Temple, teams had to climb 500 steps to the summit of the temple to receive their next clue from the holy man.
After getting their clue at the temple, teams had to search for a clue box among the four Chinese Clan Jetties in George Town, Penang. They would discover that the clue box was located at the Chew Clan Jetty.

Leg 4 (Malaysia → Thailand)

Airdate: 3 November 2016
 George Town (Penang International Airport) to Phuket, Thailand (Phuket International Airport)
 Thai Chang (Phung Chang Cave)
Thung Kha Ngok (Phang Nga Elephant Park)
Thalang (Sarasin Bridge)
 Thalang (Wat Tha Chat Chai)
Thalang (Wat Mai Khao)  
Thalang (Lay Pang Beach) 

For their Speed Bump, Rach & Vicky had to enter the Phung Chang Cave, where they had to find an elephant statuette hidden inside the cave and return it before they could continue racing.

The leg's Detour was a choice between Muay Thai or Un-Tie. For both Detour choices, teams traveled to Wat Tha Chat Chai, overlooking the Sarasin Bridge. In Muay Thai, teams had to learn a traditional Wai Kru ritual and perform it to the satisfaction of a Muay Thai master to receive their next clue. In Un-Tie, teams had to first untie the knots on a rope. Then, by using a pontoon raft, teams had to cross the water from the shoreline to the floating village nearby by pulling themselves along an aerial rope course to retrieve their clue before they could return to the shoreline.

In this leg's Roadblock, one team member had to remain still for 15 minutes while balancing a stack of coins on their backhands and head to receive their next clue; otherwise they had to start the task again.

Additional tasks
At Phang Nga Elephant Park, teams had to collect pineapple leaves to feed the elephants. Once they had gathered enough pineapple leaves, they had to go through a marked path and bring an elephant from the river by riding on the elephant to the feeding area. Once they had fed the elephants, they would receive their next clue.
At Lay Pang Beach, teams would find their next clue at the coconut stand. After getting their clue at the coconut stand, teams were instructed to bring two coconuts down the beach to the nearby Pit Stop.
There was an unused Yield that was not aired.

Leg 5 (Thailand → Vietnam)

Airdate: 10 November 2016
Sirinat National Park (Nai Yang Beach Resort) (Pit Start)
 Phuket (Phuket International Airport) to Ho Chi Minh City, Vietnam (Tan Son Nhat International Airport)
Ho Chi Minh City (Hồ Câu Tôm Giải Trí Thanh Đa) 
 Ho Chi Minh City (Khu Du Lịch Bình Quới 1)
Ho Chi Minh City (Đường Nguyễn Văn Cừ – Photocopy Ngọc Yến)
 Ho Chi Minh City (Công Viên Tao Đàn  or Hồ Thị Kỷ Flower Market)
Ho Chi Minh City (Quán Bụi Restaurant)  
Ho Chi Minh City (Công Viên Quách Thị Trang  overlooking Chợ Bến Thành) 

This season's only Fast Forward told teams to go to Khu du lịch Bình Quới 1 in Bình Thạnh District and eat rice inside clay pots in an attempt to find a Vietnamese gold coin in one of the rice patties. For every clay pot they selected, they had break the clay pot and eat the contents before making another choice. The first team to find the coin would receive the Fast Forward award. Anita & Tom and Will & Alex both attempted to do the Fast Forward in Leg 5, but neither team found the coin to complete the task. As a result, no team claimed the Fast Forward.

This leg's Detour was a choice between Badminton Bash or Flower Power. In Badminton Bash, teams travelled to Công Viên Tao Đàn, where they had to play badminton. If teams could score 10 points before their opponent scored 21 points, they would receive their next clue. In Flower Power, teams travelled to Hồ Thị Kỷ Flower Market. Then, they had to carry two empty baskets and find some flower stalls inside the flower market to gather some flowers. After they gathered all the flowers, they had to deliver the flowers to the flower retailer, H2 Flower Shop to receive their next clue.

In this leg's Roadblock, one team member had to eat five courses of Vietnamese exotic delicacies, rats, bats, centipedes, scorpions and lizards, to receive their next clue.

Additional tasks
At Hồ Câu Tôm Giải Trí Thanh Đa, teams had to catch four prawns from the prawns’ pool inside the restaurant to receive their next clue.
At Đường Nguyễn Văn Cừ, teams had to search for Mr. Ngọc at the Photocopy Ngọc Yến, where he would photocopy and stamp their next clue.

Leg 6 (Vietnam → Philippines)

Airdate: 17 November 2016
 Ho Chi Minh City (Tan Son Nhat International Airport) to Manila, Philippines (Ninoy Aquino International Airport)
Pasay (Ninoy Aquino International Airport Terminal 2 – Grab Taxi Station)
Manila (Quiapo Market)
Pasay (Red Cross Pasay Chapter)
 Quezon City (Partas Bus Terminal) to Vigan, Ilocos Sur (Partas Bus Terminal)
Santa (Ilocos Sur Adventure Zone) (Overnight Rest) 
Vigan (Calle Crisologo – M.A. Parel Antique Shop) 
 Vigan (Old Town Vigan and Plaza Burgos)
Vigan (Plaza Salcedo) 
Bantay (Bantay Bell Tower) 

In this leg's Roadblock, one team member had to ride a face-first zip line across the Abra River to hit a floating target underneath to receive their next clue.

This leg's Detour was a choice between Longganisa Kalesa or Carabao Karaoke. In Longganisa Kalesa, teams had to stuff 15 traditional sausages, known as longganisa, while riding a kalesa, a traditional Filipino horse-drawn calash, and buggy through the ancient cobblestone streets towards Plaza Burgos. Once all the sausages were properly made and met the satisfaction of the judges, teams would receive their next clue. In Carabao Karaoke, teams had to learn the Ilocano version of the children's song "Six Little Ducks" while traveling on a carabao cart until they reached Plaza Burgos. At the plaza, teams had to perform in front of the crowd to the judge's satisfaction to receive their next clue.

Additional task
At the Grab Taxi Station in Ninoy Aquino International Airport, teams had to hire a taxi to take them to Quiapo Market. Once at the market, teams had to navigate through the busy streets to buy items needed for a disaster preparedness kit which includes rice, sugar, a first aid kit, and an umbrella. After getting the essential items, they had to travel to the Red Cross Pasay Chapter to exchange their items for their next clue.
The U-Turn this leg was not used by any team.

Leg 7 (Philippines → Singapore)

Airdate: 24 November 2016
 Bantay (Bantay Church) to Laoag, Ilocos Norte (Laoag International Airport)
 Laoag (Laoag International Airport) to Singapore (Changi Airport)
Singapore (Sentosa – Resorts World Sentosa (S.E.A. Aquarium)) 
Singapore (Gardens by the Bay East – Skyline Promenade)
Singapore (OUE Bayfront Rooftop)
Singapore (Singapore Turf Club) 
Singapore (Marina Bay – Moving Boat) 

In this leg's Roadblock, one team member had to change into a diving suit and dive into the Open Ocean habitat tank, where they had to find a treasure chest. They would show a flash card of fish name inside the chest to their teammate outside the tank who had to search through several photos of fish and match one of the photos with the name of the fish taken from the chest to receive their next clue.

This leg's Detour was a choice between Skate Rat or Drone Hat. In Skate Rat, one team member had to skate on an electric skateboard and complete a slalom course while carrying two trays of stacked cans without falling down or disturbing the balance of the stacked cans to receive their next clue. In Drone Hat, one team member had to pilot a remote controlled drone helicopter and land it on a helipad placed on a helmet worn by their teammate to receive their next clue.

Additional tasks
After the Roadblock, teams had to take a Grab car to Gardens by the Bay and search from Skyline Promenade using a pair of binoculars for an Amazing Race flag on the skyline. Once they had spotted the flag, they had to identify and head to the location, the rooftop of OUE Bayfront, to get their next clue.
In order to reach the Pit Stop, teams had to travel to Esplanade Jetty, Merlion Park Jetty or Marina Bayfront South Jetty, and board a moving boat that would land at these three locations.

Additional notes
Teams were transported from Bantay to Laoag Airport by minibus.
At Resorts World Sentosa, teams had to enter from the casino drop-off point to get to the S.E.A. Aquarium.

Leg 8 (Singapore → Yogyakarta)

Airdate: 1 December 2016
Singapore (Robertson Quay – Grand Copthorne Waterfront) (Pit Start)
 East Region (Changi Airport) to Yogyakarta, Yogyakarta, Indonesia (Adisutjipto International Airport)
 Sleman (Pasar Kalasan )
Semanu (Goa Jomblang ) 
Sleman (Prambanan Temple – South Side)  
Yogyakarta (Alun-Alun Selatan)
Yogyakarta (Ndalem Ngabean) 

For their Speed Bump, Eric & Rona would be blindfolded and had to drink a cup of traditional Indonesian herbal concoction, known as jamu. After removing their blindfolds, they had to search among several bottles for one that held the same herbal concoction that they drank before they could continue racing.

Then, in the middle of the tightrope, they had to climb down a rope ladder to retrieve their clue beneath them. Once they had retrieved their clue, they had to ascend back and return to be reunited with their partner before they could continue racing. Should the team member drop the clue or fall off from the tightrope, they had wait for their turn before they could continue the task over again.

In this leg's second Roadblock, one team member, regardless of who performed the previous Roadblock, had walk around the holiest inner zone of the temple compound while memorising the names and locations of the Hindu deities inside the temple. Then, they would be given the map of the temple compound and had to correctly label all the locations of the Hindu deities by their names to receive their next clue.

Additional tasks
After the second Roadblock, teams participated in the traditional Yogyakarta archery of Jemparingan Mataraman, whereby each team member had to hit a bull’s eye target with an arrow while sitting down to receive their next clue.
At Alun-alun Selatan, teams had to find their next clue, attached in one of the cycling car, known as odong-odong. Then, teams had to convince two locals to join them to take a ride on an odong-odong around the town square to receive their next clue. Then, they would have to ride again on the odong-odong to Ndalem Ngabean in order to reach the Pit Stop.
There was an unused Yield this leg that was not aired.

Leg 9 (Yogyakarta → East Java)

Airdate: 8 December 2016
 Yogyakarta (Lempuyangan Railway Station) to Glagah, Banyuwangi Regency, East Java Karangasem Railway Station )
Glagah (Kemiren – Sanggar Genjah Arum ) (Overnight Rest)
Licin (Ijen Volcano)  
Glagah (SDN 2 Kemiren)   
Glagah (Kalibendo Coffee Factory)
Glagah (Kalibendo Coffee Plantation – Pendopo Ramean) 

In this leg's Roadblock, one team member had to take part in the labour-intensive sulfur mining operation, where they had to collect and carry sulfur slabs using two baskets on a pole to the crushing area. Then, they had to crush the slabs into smaller blocks, pack them inside sacks and carry them to the weighing area. Once they had collected  of sulfur, they would receive their next clue.

This season's final Detour was a choice between Dragon Horse or Human Bull. In Dragon Horse, teams had to participate in a traditional art of Jaran Kencak, where they had to fully decorate and dress up a horse typically used in a wedding ceremony procession. Once approved by the judge, they would go to the procession and ride on a horse-drawn carriage before receiving their next clue from a newlywed couple. In Human Bull, teams had to transfer a handful of rice husk across the paddy field to an empty basket on the other side. However, they had to avoid the kebo-keboan, a human dressed up as a bull, that would block their way to the basket. Once the basket was full, teams would receive their next clue.

Additional tasks
At Sanggar Genjah Arum in Kemiren, teams had to sign up for one of four departure times to enter the coffee shop the following morning. At the designated time, the teams would enter the coffee shop, where the shop's owner, Mr. Setiawan Subekti would serve them a popular Banyuwangi's coffee of Kopai Osing and also would give them their next clue.
At the Kalibendo Coffee Factory, teams emptied an  bag of coffee beans before searching for seven red-coloured coffee beans with letters of P-I-T-S-T-O-P among the coffee beans to receive their next clue.

Leg 10 (East Java → Bali)

Airdate: 15 December 2016
 Kalipuro (Ketapang Harbor ) to Gilimanuk, Jembrana Regency, Bali (Gilimanuk Harbor )
Sanur, Denpasar (Pura Dalem Pengembak)
Sanur (Pantai Mertasari)
Sanur (Pantai Mertasari – Taman Inspirasi)
Blahbatuh, Gianyar Regency (Pura Samuan Tiga) 
Denpasar (Bajra Sandhi Monument) 

In this season's final Roadblock, one team member had to arrange coconuts with symbols of objects and places they encountered throughout the season (as well as misleading names and symbols), the name of the Pit Stop, and the team eliminated in each leg during the season on a board of a life-sized traditional mancala game of congkak in the corresponding space on the congkak according to the legs visited, in chronological order:
{| class="wikitable"
! Leg
! Objects or Places Encountered
! Pit Stop
! Team(s) Eliminated
|-
! 1
|Compass
|Bogor
|Lisa & Nicole  Rei & Keiji
|- 
! 2
|Wayang Golek puppet
|Ciater 
|Alphaeus & Brandon
|- 
! 3
|Waterfall Hill Temple
|Hean Boo Thean
|Non Elimination
|- 
! 4
|Coconut
|Lay Pang
|Rach & Vicky
|- 
! 5
|Scorpion
|Chợ Bến Thành
|Will & Alex
|-
! 6
|Bull's eye target
|Bantay
|Anita & Tom
|-
! 7
|Stingray
|Marina Bay
|Non Elimination
|-
! 8
|Rope ladder
|Ndalem Ngabean
|JK & Mike
|-
! 9
|Volcano
|Pendopo Ramean
|Treasuri & Louisa
|-
! 10
| colspan="3" style="text-align: center;" | Finale
|}
Once the coconuts were placed in the correct spots, teams were given their final clue.

Additional tasks
At Pura Dalem Pengembak, teams had to assemble two Balinese long ornamental poles, known as penjor. Once the penjor artist was satisfied, they had to deliver them to a penjor display area at Pantai Mertasari to receive their next clue.
At Pantai Mertasari, teams participated in a traditional Indonesian pole climb, known as Panjat Pinang, whereby each team member had to climb a slippery Pinang palm tree pole to retrieve a marked item at the top of the pole to receive their next clue.
At Taman Inspirasi, teams had to change into their swimsuits and assemble a traditional fishing boat of jukung according to the finished sample. Once done, they had to paddle the boat to search through several traditional lobster traps for a marked one and return it to a fisherman at the shore to receive their next clue.

Reception
The premiere episode was the best performing English Original Production (OP) in Singapore, Malaysia and the Philippines in 2016. It also posted 26% and 33% increases in Singapore and Malaysia, respectively, over 2015's record-breaking Asia's Got Talent, putting the series on track to become the most watched English OP ever in Asia.

References

External links

Asia 5
2016 television seasons
Television shows filmed in Indonesia
Television shows filmed in Malaysia
Television shows filmed in Thailand
Television shows filmed in Vietnam
Television shows filmed in the Philippines
Television shows filmed in Singapore